This was the first edition of the tournament.

Blaž Kavčič won the title after defeating Go Soeda in the final 6–0, 1–0 retired.

Seeds

Draw

Finals

Top half

Bottom half

References
 Main Draw
 Qualifying Draw

Singles
Wind Energy Holding Bangkok Open - Singles
 in Thai tennis